Canoeing is an Universiade optional sport since the 1987 in Zagreb, Yugoslavia. After this, canoeing was optional sport only at the 2013 Summer Universiade in Kazan, Russian Federation.

Editions

Medal table 
Last updated after the 2013 Summer Universiade

References 
Sports123

 
Sports at the Summer Universiade
Universiade